Edward M. Ryder, Jr. (born c. 1948) is a former member of the Ohio House of Representatives.

He served as the clerk of the Euclid City Council and also as the Newbury Township Trustee. When elected to office, he became the youngest member of the House; he served on the Interstate Legislate Committee on Lake Erie, and opposed a jet port near Euclid, Ohio that would have caused Euclid to be split by a new highway.

References

Republican Party members of the Ohio House of Representatives
Living people
Date of birth missing (living people)
Place of birth missing (living people)
1940s births